Sleep In Your Car is a live field recording style album by American indie-folk, group Insomniac Folklore. It was recorded onto cassette tape by Eric Funn using a single microphone with no overdubs. The recording occurred while the band was on tour through Stroudsburg, Pennsylvania, in the Summer of 2013.

Sleep In Your Car was first released digitally by Funn Folk Sounds  and soon after released on Cassette by Insomniac Folklore.

The Modern Folk said that "this particular release documents an energetic performance." and further described Insomniac Folklore as "a driving guitars and drums three piece characterized by dead-pan Calvin Johnson (musician) esque male vocals harmonized with sweeter female singing." and proceeded to talk about the field-style by saying'  "the clipping, one mic cassette tape recording is perfect for the band's sound and the label's mission"

Track listing

Personnel 
 Insomniac Folklore
 Tyler Hentschel – Vocals, guitar, Stomping
 Adrienne Michelle - Vocals
 Amanda Curry - Bass guitar, Vocals

References 

2014 albums
Insomniac Folklore albums